Maurice John Willis (1900 – November 10, 1975) was an educator and political figure in Saskatchewan. He represented Elrose from 1944 to 1960 in the Legislative Assembly of Saskatchewan as a Co-operative Commonwealth Federation (CCF) member.

He was born in Stony Mountain, Manitoba and educated at the University of Manitoba. Willis was principal of the Elrose School for six years and then of the Eston High School for 29 years. He was president of the local Teachers' Association and served as councillor to the Saskatchewan Teachers' Federation from 1939 to 1942.

References 

Saskatchewan Co-operative Commonwealth Federation MLAs
20th-century Canadian politicians
1900 births
1975 deaths
University of Manitoba alumni
Canadian educators